Mario Pedraza Abreu (born 18 July 1973) is a Cuban retired footballer.

Club career
He played his entire career for his provincial team Cienfuegos, except for half a season in Germany with Bonner SC, when then Cuban leader Fidel Castro approved for the whole Cuban team to join the German 4th level side for part of the 1998/99 season.

International career
Pedraza made his international debut for Cuba in 1995 and has earned a total of 49 caps, scoring 1 goal. He represented his country in 16 FIFA World Cup qualification matches (1 goal) and played at 2 CONCACAF Gold Cup final tournaments.

His final international was a February 2005 Gold Cup qualifier against Jamaica.

International goals
Scores and results list Cuba's goal tally first.

References

External links
 

1973 births
Living people
People from Cienfuegos Province
Association football defenders
Cuban footballers
Cuba international footballers
1998 CONCACAF Gold Cup players
2002 CONCACAF Gold Cup players
FC Cienfuegos players
Bonner SC players
Cuban expatriate footballers
Expatriate footballers in Germany
Cuban expatriate sportspeople in Germany